Carl Berman (born April 5, 1985) is a former professional gridiron football wide receiver. He played collegiately at the Indiana State University. While at Indiana State, Berman caught a total of 136 catches for 1,666 yards and had 11 touchdowns.  He also returned kickoffs at Indiana State.

On September 11, 2007 the Saskatchewan Roughriders of the Canadian Football League added him to their Developmental Squad. He was released by the Riders on September 25, 2007. He was later resigned and on October 17, 2007, was placed on the Game Nine Injured List by the Riders.  He spent the remainder of the Riders Grey Cup-championship season on the practice squad.  He appeared in four games during the Riders' 2008 playoff season; he had 22 returns for 222 yards, 1 rush (14 yds) and 1 reception (13 yds).  He was released by Saskatchewan on June 11, 2009.

He had previously attended training camp with the Washington Redskins and was released by the Redskins on September 1, 2007.

On June 3, 2010, Berman was signed by the Toronto Argonauts. He was released by the Argonauts on August 31, 2010.  One week later, he was signed by the Edmonton Eskimos

References

External links
 
 

1985 births
Living people
American football wide receivers
Canadian football wide receivers
African-American players of American football
African-American players of Canadian football
Edmonton Elks players
Indiana State Sycamores football players
Players of Canadian football from St. Petersburg, Florida
Saskatchewan Roughriders players
Toronto Argonauts players
Washington Redskins players
Players of American football from St. Petersburg, Florida
21st-century African-American sportspeople
20th-century African-American people